Achille Caracciolo (died 1623) was a Roman Catholic prelate who served as Bishop of Potenza (1616–1623).

Biography
On 2 May 1616, Achille Caracciolo was appointed during the papacy of Pope Paul V as Bishop of Potenza.
On 2 May 1616, he was consecrated bishop by Giovanni Garzia Mellini, Cardinal-Priest of Santi Quattro Coronati with Giovanni Battista del Tufo, Bishop Emeritus of Acerra, and Paolo De Curtis, Bishop Emeritus of Isernia, serving as co-consecrators. 
He served as Bishop of Potenza until his death in 1623.

References

External links and additional sources
 (for Chronology of Bishops) 
 (for Chronology of Bishops)  

17th-century Italian Roman Catholic bishops
Bishops appointed by Pope Paul V
1623 deaths